is a Japan-based international operator of ryokan (Japanese inns) with its head office in Karuizawa, Nagano. Founded in 1904 by Kuniji Hoshino as a forestry business in Karuizawa, in the Japanese Alps, it opened its first hot spring resort in 1914.

Rebranded by Yoshiharu Hoshino in 1995 as Hoshino Resorts, it has expanded across Japan and Asia with an eco-friendly policy, use of organic local produce at its restaurants, self-sufficient energy usage, and a theme of traditional Japanese-style resort accommodation. Part of the company's original theme is what Japan would be like if it continued to modernize without the influence of the West.

Hoshino Resorts has also developed its bridal business through Hotel Bleston Court, a real estate leasing business, and its food business. Noriyuki Hamada, Executive Chef of Bleston Court Yukawatan restaurant in Karuizawa became the first ever Japanese chef to be recognised at the Bocuse d'Or in January 2013, winning third prize, while Hoshinoya Kyoto chef Ichiro Kubota earned a Michelin Star in October 2012.

History 
Hoshino Resorts began life in 1904, as a forestry business in Karuizawa, which had just begun to become popular as a location for holiday villas. Founder Kuniji Hoshino then opened the first Hoshino Onsen Ryokan ten years later in 1914. As natural hot springs were uncovered in the area, Karuizawa became a center for 1920s culture, attracting some of the most notable authors, poets and feminists of the period such as Tōson Shimazaki, Kanzō Uchimura, Akiko Yosano, and Hakushū Kitahara to the "Liberal Education of Art Workshop" held in the area. It began its policy towards energy self-sufficiency as early as 1929, with the opening of its first hydroelectric power plant.

 
Yoshimasa Hoshino, the second generation heir, was influenced by Showa era poet and ornithologist Godo Nakanishi, who commented that "Until now it has been customary to eat wild birds, but from hereonafter, we will enter a phase in which people will find enjoyment in watching them." Hoshino Onsen Ryokan then began its first guided nature tours, called "Tancho-kai", establishing Japan's first National Wild Bird Forest in 1974 in Karuizawa, and evolving its tours into the 1992 established the Picchio Wildlife Research Center, awarded the first ever "Eco-Tourism" Grand Prize in Japan by the Ministry of Environment on June 5, 2005.

The second half of the 20th century, from the post-war depression through to the increase of international travel, caused a decline in interest in many traditional ryokan. Hoshino Onsen Ryokan rebranded itself as Hoshino Resorts in 1995 when current president, and fourth-generation family member,  took the helm. Since 1999, the company has pursued aims to produce zero-emissions resorts, and acquired multiple properties across Japan that had struggled since the 1980s economic bubble burst. It has refurbished, rebranded and incorporated most of its properties into one of its three brands, whilst constructing new properties from scratch in Okinawa and soon in Marunouchi, Tokyo, for its premier Hoshinoya brand.

Current business activities
Hoshino Resorts is currently led by fourth-generation family heir Yoshiharu Hoshino. Born in Karuizawa in 1960, the Keio University graduate went on to Cornell University School of Hotel Administration, obtaining a Masters of Management in Hospitality. He was appointed president of Hoshino Onsen in 1991, but fired six months later when his initial ideas to rejuvenate the business failed. He was recalled in 1995 and has led the company since, further being selected as the first "Charisma of Tourism" by the Ministry of Land, Infrastructure, Transport and Tourism in 2003.

During the initial stages of Yoshiharu Hoshino's management, he first restructured the company, reducing family members on the company board so that more than half would be outsiders brought in on an evaluation system; "The staff worked in poor conditions and the Hoshino family seemed to have special rights," he told the Financial Times. By employing university graduates who themselves can present ideas such as eco-tourism, the company has seen a quick reversal from a period of high staff turnover, to a highly sought after employer with a merit-based remuneration system.

Yo-Ho Brewing Company
Yo-Ho Brewing, one of Japan's leading producers of craft beer, was established as a subsidiary of Hoshino Resort Company in 1996. With brewing facilities based in Karuizawa, the company produces a range of traditional beer styles.

In September 2014 30% of the company was sold to Kirin Beer, the two breweries agreeing to cooperate in business areas such as shipping, marketing, procurement and product development.

Brands 
Hoshino Resorts has developed three separate hospitality brands over the years aimed at different demographics. Besides its flagship Hoshinoya brand, it also operates the KAI brand and Risonare.

Hoshinoya 
The Hoshinoya brand (星のや), represents Hoshino Resort's flagship properties, currently six, including: Hoshinoya Kyoto (in Arashiyama), Hoshinoya Okinawa (on Taketomi island) and the original Hoshinoya Karuizawa. All represent the company's dedication to luxurious traditional Japanese hospitality with modern elements.

Hoshinoya Fuji opened in 2015. Hoshinoya Tokyo, the fifth flagship resort and first to be constructed inside a major city, is located in downtown Marunouchi. The property was announced on March 5, 2013, and opened in July 2016.

Hoshinoya Bali in Ubud opened in early 2017.

Hoshinoya Karuizawa and Kyoto have both been members of the Small Luxury Hotels of the World (SLH) group since December 2009.

KAI 

The Kai brand, is a chain of authentic onsen, natural hot spring resorts with a style of traditional Japan which serve kaiseki cuisine featuring local ingredients in each property. Targeted towards couples and women, it currently operates resorts in Aso, Atami, Kaga, Hakone, Itō, Izumo, Matsumoto, Tsugaru, and Kai Alps near the Tateyama Kurobe Alpine Route. The brand was launched in 2011.

Kai Kaga is typical of the Hoshino Resort strategy of finding existing properties and refurbishing them in traditional style with modern design elements. Originally built in the 1630s, the ryokan faces a restored communal bathhouse known as Kosoyu, and has undergone renovation since being acquired. Its rooms have been adapted to washitsu Japanese style, with zaisu (legless) chairs, while the spa, inspired by local peasant Imohori Togoro, who first discovered gold in the area, offers gold-leaf facial treatments.

Kai Hakone, built in 1987 and acquired in 2012, combines paper screens and tatami mats in its rooms with modern sofas and kakejiku by Gallery Tsuyuki. It also provides performances of Kamishibai, folk tales about yosegi-kaizu told using paper scrolls.

Risonare 
Risonare, is Hoshino Resorts' modern accommodation, designed to be stylish and appealing for families, and often offering a range of sports activities. Properties include Risonare Tomamu offering skiing in central Hokkaido, Risonare Kohamajima offering golf and windsurfing in southern Okinawa, Risonare Yatsugatake located in a wine region in central Honshu, and Risonare Atami, a seaside hot-spring resort south of Tokyo. Italian, French, and Japanese cuisine are featured in many Risonare resorts, though vegan diners are also available.

Other 
Other brands include Omo, focused on urban city centers serving as a base for exploring, and BEB, designed for stay-cations with a group of friends with rooms and louge areas built to accommodate multiple family groups.

Notable properties

Hoshinoya Karuizawa 

Hoshino Resorts' original property is located in Karuizawa, an area of Nagano Prefecture, under Mount Asama, first deemed fit as a resort and villa spot in the late 19th century by foreign missionaries like British/Canadian theologian Alexander Croft Shaw in (1886). Emperor Akihito met his wife Michiko in the area, and it is the only place in the world to have hosted both summer and winter Olympic events. Hoshinoya Karuizawa is located on the banks of the Yukawa river.

First opened in 1914, it was closed in 1995 for ten years by Yoshiharu Hoshino, before being reopened as Hoshinoya Karuizawa in 2005, the first eco-resort in Japan. The resort and its 'Tombo-no-yu' hot springs are powered by geothermal heat from the volcanos in the surrounding topography. This, as well as hydroelectricity from mountain streams, provides the energy for the rest of the resort's power. The property is Hoshino's first to achieve the policy aim of zero-emissions.

The property has 77 rooms, two hot-spring baths and a chaya tea room.

Hoshinoya Kyoto 
The second Hoshinoya, opened in 2009, is the former home of wealthy merchant Ryoi Suminokura (1554–1614). Suminokura is remembered mostly for creating the Takase River canal that runs through Kyoto, completed in 1611 and allowing goods to be transported to the then capital. His secluded home was constructed on the banks of the Ōi River in the forests of Arashiyama, famed for its bamboo.

The "riverside sanctuary" is reached by a small private wooden boat ride of ten minutes and retains its 19th-century wood-framed buildings, with 25 tatami-mat rooms, a library, and two gardens. Temple bells ring upon the arrival of each guest, and its moss-traced stone walkways are lit by iron lanterns.

The rooms have been noted for both their natural location, visited by wild monkeys, surrounded by cherry trees, and bathed in natural light, but also for their traditional style, with hinoki cypress wood bathtubs, heated chestnut-wood floors, and wallpaper made by Kyoto craftsmen from hand-printed woodblocks (karakami).

The kaiseki restaurant, run by Executive Chef Ichiro Kubota and focusing on local, seasonal and sustainable ingredients, was awarded a Michelin Star in October 2012. Kubota previously held a Michelin Star as head chef of London's Umu restaurant.

Hoshinoya Taketomi Island 

Opened in 2012, Hoshinoya Taketomi Island is the only resort on the island of Taketomi Island (part of the Yaeyama Islands group), a 2.4 square mile island with 342 inhabitants, 1,200 miles southwest of Tokyo. One of the last vestiges of the former Ryukyu Kingdom to retain its long-held identity, local village chiefs approval was needed before the complex could be built. When it was, it was under strict rules to respect the architectural style of the island, with only single-tier structures eventually approved and constructed.

The property consists of 48 wood-structure villas arranged as a mini-village with stone walls, prominent Shisa displayed upon rooftops, and a lobby live-house where locals perform music on traditional sanshin. It was selected for three awards in the May 2013 edition of the Conde Nast Traveler "Best New Hotels in the World"; "Best New Hotels to Splurge On", "World's Most Romantic New Hotels", and "Amazing Pools at the Best New Hotels".

Awards 
Eco-Tourism Grand Prize 2005 – Picchio Wildlife Research Center, awarded by the Ministry of Environment
Michelin Star 2012 – Ichiro Kubota, Executive Chef of Hoshinoya Kyoto
Bocuse d'Or 2013 (Bronze) – Noriyuki Hamada, Executive Chef of Bleston Court Yukawatan, Karuizawa

See also 
 Ryokan (Japanese inn)

References

External links
 
 Hoshino Resorts - Official Facebook Page

Japanese cuisine
Hospitality companies of Japan
Hotel chains in Japan
Luxury brands
Companies based in Nagano Prefecture
Privately held companies of Japan